Bright Christopher Addae (also spelled Addai; born 19 December 1992) is a Ghanaian professional footballer who plays as a midfielder.

Club career

Wa All Stars 
Born in Wa, Addae began his career with Wa All Stars.

Parma and loan deals 
In November 2009, it was announced that he would be moving to Italian club Parma in the summer of 2010, after signing a four-year contract. In January 2011, he was loaned to Spanish club Terrassa until the end of the 2010–11 season, as Parma ran out of non-EU registration quota for signing players from abroad. In August 2011 his contract was finally registered in Lega Serie A. Addae moved on loan to Crotone in July 2012.

He signed on loan for Slovenian club Gorica on 1 July 2013.

On 31 January 2014, he was signed by Gubbio along with Alessandro Gozzi.

Ascoli 
On 17 July 2014, Addae was signed by Lega Pro club Ascoli in a definitive deal on a 2+1 year contract. Addae and the club confirmed the optional third year on 30 August 2015. On 2 May 2017, he signed a new two-year contract. Throughout his 5 years with the club, he played 155 league matches and scored 8 goals.

Juve Stadia 
Ahead of the 2019–20 season, Addae joined Juve Stabia in Serie B on a two-year contract. He made his debut 25 August 2019, after playing the full 90 minutes in a 2–1 loss against Empoli. In his only season with the club, he played 28 league matches and scored 2 goals.

Hermannstadt 
On 10 September 2020 he moved to Romania and signed with Hermannstadt.

International career
Addae made three appearances at the 2009 FIFA U-20 World Cup, and made his senior international debut for Ghana in 2010.

Personal life 
Addae started a foundation called the Bright Addae Foundation to support the needy, orphans, widows and widowers in Assin Fosu, a town in the Central Region of Ghana. The foundation has also supported The Ghana Skatesoccer Association.

Honours
Ascoli Picchio F.C. 1898
Lega Pro: 2014–15
ND Gorica

 Slovenian Football Cup: 2013–14
Ghana U20	
FIFA U-20 World Cup: 2009

References

1992 births
Living people
People from Upper West Region
Association football midfielders
Ghanaian footballers
Ghana international footballers
Ghana under-20 international footballers
Serie B players
Serie C players
Slovenian PrvaLiga players
S.S. Juve Stabia players
Parma Calcio 1913 players
Terrassa FC footballers
F.C. Crotone players
ND Gorica players
A.S. Gubbio 1910 players
Ascoli Calcio 1898 F.C. players
FC Hermannstadt players
Ghanaian expatriate footballers
Ghanaian expatriate sportspeople in Italy
Expatriate footballers in Italy
Ghanaian expatriate sportspeople in Spain
Expatriate footballers in Spain
Expatriate footballers in Slovenia
Ghanaian expatriate sportspeople in Slovenia
Expatriate footballers in Romania
Ghanaian expatriate sportspeople in Romania